XHPX-FM is a Spanish & English Top 40 (CHR) station at 98.3 FM in Ciudad Juárez, Chihuahua, Mexico. It broadcasts from studios on Mesa Street in El Paso, Texas, United States and a transmitter atop Cerro Bola in Juárez.

History
XHPX received its concession on October 18, 1977, though it had been on the air for several years by that point and had changed frequencies from 93.7 MHz in 1974. The concession was held by Ángel Beltrán Elizarraraz, but the station was operated by MVS from the start, first with the Stereorey format (later moved to XHTO-FM) and later  FM Globo format. In 2000, the station became one of the original Exa FM stations. Most operations moved to studios in El Paso in 2005.

In 1993, it was sold to F.M. Globo de Juárez, S.A. de C.V., which in turn transferred the concession to Frecuencia Modulada de Mexicali in May 1999, MVS de Juárez in December 1999, and Stereorey México in 2012. All are subsidiaries of MVS.

See also 
Border blaster

References

External links 
Official website
Exa FM 98.3 official website

1977 establishments in Mexico
Radio stations established in 1977
Mass media in El Paso, Texas
Mass media in Ciudad Juárez
Radio stations in Chihuahua
Spanish-language radio stations
Contemporary hit radio stations in Mexico
MVS Radio